The London Conservative Party mayoral selection of 2003 was the process by which the Conservative Party selected its candidate for Mayor of London, to stand in the 2004 mayoral election. Former Member of Parliament Steven Norris was selected to stand.

Selection process

The Mayoral candidate was selected via a postal ballot of London Conservative Party members.

Candidates

 Steven Norris, candidate for London Mayor in 2000, Member of Parliament for Epping Forest 1988-1997
 Roger Evans, London Assembly member for Havering and Redbridge

Result

Steven Norris, previously the Conservative Party mayoral candidate in 2000 and the former MP for Epping Forest, was reselected by a wide margin over Havering and Redbridge Assembly Member and Conservative spokesman for Transport Roger Evans on the 16 February 2003.

See also
2004 London mayoral election

References

Conservative Party (UK)
Mayoral elections in London
Conservative Party mayoral selection
London Conservative Party mayoral selection
London Conservative Party mayoral selection